The 2019–20 Inverness Caledonian Thistle season was the club's 26th Season in Scottish football.

Fixtures and results

Friendlies

League 
,
Clark 
Shankland |stadium=Caledonian Thistle|location=Inverness|result=L}}

ALL SPFL GAMES POSTPONED FOR FORESEEABLE FUTURE DUE TO CORONAVIRUS PANDEMIC

Scottish Cup

League Cup 
On 28 May 2019, Inverness were drawn into Group D of the Scottish League Cup, alongside Dundee, Raith Rovers, Peterhead and Cove Rangers.

Challenge Cup

North of Scotland Cup

Team Statistics

League table

Management Statistics

First team player statistics

League Goalscorers

Overall Goalscorers 

*as of match played 10 March 2020

**players in Italics left the club during the season, so cannot move up the table

Transfers 

*At time of transfer/loan

See also 
 List of Inverness Caledonian Thistle F.C. seasons

References

Inverness Caledonian Thistle F.C. seasons
Inverness